The Ludogorie (usually used with a definite article, Лудогорието, Ludogorieto) or Deliorman (Делиорман,  and Bulgarian: lud - "mad", "crazy" and gora - "forest"), is a region in northeastern Bulgaria stretching over the plateau of the same name. Major cities in the region are Targovishte, Razgrad, Dulovo, Novi Pazar, Pliska, Preslav and Isperih. The region is bordered to the west by the Provadiya River and the Beli Lom; to the east it transitions into the Dobruja plateau.

The plateau was formed of Karst limestone from the Lower Cretaceous covered by loess material. Among the region's geological resources are kaolinite, fireclay and mica. Although the Ludogorie is poor in overground water resources, with only a few low rivers such as the Krapinets and the Kulak, it is rich in underground waters. 

In ancient times, the Ludogorie was inhabited by the Thracian tribes of the Getae who left behind local architectural landmarks such as the Thracian Tomb of Sveshtari, a richly-decorated 3rd-century BC tomb that is a UNESCO World Heritage Site. Until the end of the 18th century, the Ludogorie was largely dominated by forests that merged with the ones of the Balkan Mountains (Stara Planina) to the south, giving the name of the region both in Bulgarian and Turkish, literally translated as "region of wild forests" in English. In recent times, the forests have been nearly completely replaced by arable land and only the woods in the Voden Reserve are the reminiscent of the former larger forest area. The soil from the chopped down forests is a rich soil with humus, very eligible for agriculture.

Ludogorie is a relatively new name, a Bulgarian calque of the older Turkish name Deliorman; it was officially introduced in 1950. In 1942, the name had been changed to Polesie, a Slavic toponym meaning "place by the woods", but this name never entered common use. The Turkish name is etymologically and semantically akin to the name of Teleorman County in southern Romania.

The Ludogorie mostly belongs to Razgrad Province, with a western part in Ruse Province, and has a mixed population of Bulgarians, Turks and Romani. The Ludogorie has attained fame for its oil wrestlers throughout time, including Koca Yusuf and Hergeleci Ibrahim.

Ludogorie Peak on Livingston Island in the South Shetland Islands, Antarctica bears the name of the region. PFC Ludogorets Razgrad, the football club of Razgrad, was also named after the Ludogorie region.
Regions of Bulgaria

References

External links
 Ludogorie.org, website of the Native Ludogorie Cultural and Educational Association 
 Razgrad and the Ludogorie, online news portal also offering online publications of the Ludogorski Vestnik newspaper 

Geography of Bulgaria
Plateaus of Europe
Geographical regions of Bulgaria
Turkish toponyms